Shyam Sunder Patidar was an Indian politician from the state of the Madhya Pradesh.
He represented Mandsaur Vidhan Sabha constituency in Madhya Pradesh Legislative Assembly by winning General election of  1952, 1957, 1962, 1972, 1980 and 1985.

References 

Year of birth missing
Year of death missing
People from Mandsaur district
Madhya Pradesh MLAs 1957–1962
Madhya Pradesh MLAs 1962–1967
Madhya Pradesh MLAs 1972–1977
Madhya Pradesh MLAs 1980–1985
Madhya Pradesh MLAs 1985–1990
Indian National Congress politicians from Madhya Pradesh